The People's Liberation Army Naval Air Force (PLANAF) is the naval aviation branch of the People's Liberation Army Navy.

Overview
Historically, the PLANAF's main role has been to provide the navy's warships with air defense coverage. Part of the coastal defense doctrine was to have naval aircraft protecting the ships, hence the reason why many PLA ships of the 1960s–70s lacked long range anti-aircraft missiles or artillery. During the Sino-Vietnamese War, the PLANAF carried out many successful bombing and airstrike missions against Vietnamese territories, such as in the Spratly Islands. The 1960s saw a series of air combat sorties flown against the Republic of China Air Force. PLANAF pilots have been credited with many major victories over the Taiwanese in these small incidents. Historical aircraft operated by the PLANAF include the J-5, the J-6, and H-5. These aircraft have been retired by the late 1990s.

Today, the PLANAF has a strength of around 26,000 personnel and 710 aircraft. It operates similar aircraft to the People's Liberation Army Air Force, including fighters, bombers, strike aircraft, tankers, reconnaissance, electronic warfare, maritime patrol, seaplane, transport, training and helicopter types. The PLANAF has traditionally received older aircraft than the PLAAF and has taken less ambitious steps towards mass modernization. Advancements in new technologies, weaponry and aircraft acquisition were made after 2000. The modern day PLANAF is capable of performing a number of roles, and is quite numerically and technologically adept in anti-ship and air defense operations.

Mission
Primary Mission
 Provide fleet air defense for PLAN surface combatants
 Patrol and hunt/destroy for submarines
 Air patrols and defense of territorial waters
 Air defense of the mainland's coastline
 Anti-ship attack

Secondary Mission
 Transport and training
 Search and rescue
 Assault transport and tactical support for amphibious operations
 Interdiction attack on enemy ground targets

Equipment

Future

Its future is unclear. However, it is certain that as the navy receives more attention, the PLANAF will receive newer aircraft and much more funding, as its significant role in projecting power over the sea is becoming evermore realized. A new transport helicopter, the Z-15, may enter naval service by 2015 as a dedicated medium-sized multi-role shipborne helicopter. This would replace the Z-9C and complement the Ka-28 Helix. In early 2006, an article reported a deal between China and Russia, which sees the PLANAF's acquisition of 40 Ka-29 assault transports, 20+ Ka-31 airborne early warning (AEW) helicopters (mounted with search radar) and up to 20 Be-200 jet amphibians. If the purchase goes ahead, that would represent a major step forward for the PLANAF in terms of capabilities. The Ka-29 may form the first dedicated transport for the marine corps, the Ka-31's powerful radar can serve in over-the-horizon target acquisitions and early warning for Chinese surface ships, and the Be-200 jet amphibian would replace the SH-5 in maritime patrol duties and ASW.

As of 2011, SAC is developing its own naval jet, called Shenyang J-15, which first flew in 2009. The Shenyang J-31 may be a future carrier based stealth fighter in the same role as the F-35C.

On June 4, 2009, UPI reported that Eastern European sources had reported that preparations had been completed to construct an aircraft carrier at Changxing Island Shipyard. China has also started constructing its own Naval Aviation Testing and Training Complex (NITKA) near Xingcheng.

The 67,500 ton ex-Soviet aircraft carrier Varyag (Admiral Kuznetsov class), which was only 70% completed and floating in Ukraine, was purchased and underwent a long refit.  Varyag was stripped of any military equipment as well as her propulsion before she was put up for sale. News reports stated that she was being refitted to be returned to operational status. Sea trials of the carrier started in late 2011, and it was commissioned on September 25, 2012, as the Liaoning.

In 2013, PLAN Air Force officer Hue Xsai announced that a second larger and more capable Type 001A aircraft carrier would be domestically produced.

In July 2018, Lieutenant General Zhang Honghe of the PLAAF stated that China is developing a new carrier-based aircraft that will replace the J-15 due to four crashes and numerous technical problems. One problem with the aircraft is that it is the heaviest carrier-borne fighter in current operation with an empty weight of 17,500 kg compared to the F/A-18E/F Super Hornet's 14,600 kg (though it is less than the F-14 Tomcat's weight of 19,800 kg). Weight problems are compounded when operating off Liaoning, as its STOBAR launch and recovery method further limits payload capacity.

See also
 Chinese aircraft carrier Liaoning
 List of active People's Liberation Army aircraft
 People's Liberation Army Air Force
 Republic of China Naval Aviation Command

References

4
Aviation in China
China